Lophonectes is a genus of small lefteye flounders found in the southwestern Pacific Ocean off Australia and New Zealand.

Species
There are currently two recognized species in this genus:
 Lophonectes gallus Günther, 1880 (Crested flounder)
 Lophonectes mongonuiensis (Regan, 1914)

References

Bothidae
Marine fish genera
Taxa named by Albert Günther